The  was a 790-foot, roll-on/roll-off ship.   According to the News Tribune, the "Great Land’s initial call at Tacoma in 1976 was celebrated as a major victory for the port over its rival Seattle in becoming the gateway to Alaska."

Collision 
On March 17, 1985, during the vessel's approach on Cook Inlet and Knik Arm to Terminal 3 at the Port of Anchorage City Docks, the Great Land collided with Terminal 3.

References

Cargo ships of the United States
1975 ships